"Little Monster" is a song written by Mike Kerr and Ben Thatcher of British rock duo Royal Blood. The song was originally recorded by the duo for release as a single, appearing on the band's second single of the same name, released by Black Mammoth Records and Warner Bros. Records on 10 February 2014. The single marked the band's first release under Warner Bros. Records after signing with the label in 2013. The track later appeared as the second track on the band's debut extended play Out of the Black, and as the sixth track on the band's eponymous debut studio album, Royal Blood. The song is included as a playable track in Guitar Hero Live.

Track listing

Personnel
Partly adapted from Out of the Black liner notes.

Royal Blood
Mike Kerr – lead vocals, bass guitar
Ben Thatcher – drums

Technical personnel
Tom Dalgety – producer, recording
John Davis – mastering
Dave Sardy – mixing

Charts

Weekly charts

Year-end charts

Certifications

Release history

References

External links
 
 Royal Blood official website

2014 singles
Warner Records singles
2014 songs
Royal Blood (band) songs
Song recordings produced by Tom Dalgety